Sympycnodes adrienneae is a species of moth of the family Cossidae. It is found in Australia, where it has been recorded from the dry inland mallee of Victoria and New South Wales.

The wingspan is 38 mm for males and 40 mm for females. The forewings are light brown with brown markings, four dark brown spots and a row of subterminal bars.

Etymology
The species is named for Adrienne, the second author's wife.

References

Moths described in 2012
Zeuzerinae